Megachile crassepunctata is a species of bee in the family Megachilidae. It was described by Yasumatsu & Hirashima in 1965.

References

Crassepunctata
Insects described in 1965